Robert Jacob Voskuhl (born November 1, 1977) is retired American professional basketball player.

After attending Strake Jesuit College Preparatory, Voskuhl went to the University of Connecticut from 1996–2000, where he was the starting center on the school's 1999 NCAA National Championship team. The squad also featured former NBA star Richard "Rip" Hamilton. He became a member of the Pi Kappa Alpha Fraternity while an undergraduate.

Professional career

Chicago Bulls (2000-2001) 
Voskuhl was drafted by the Chicago Bulls with the 33rd overall pick of the 2000 NBA Draft, he only played 16 games in his rookie season, averaging 1.9 points and 2.1 rebounds per game. The Bulls were in a rebuilding era and were looking for young players to revitalize the franchise; Voskuhl had a good opportunity to become a key young role player on the team, however he didn't receive valuable minutes on the court and the Bulls would be an abysmal team until the 2004-2005 season. And after just one season with the team, the Bulls let him go.

Phoenix Suns (2001-2005) 
Voskuhl was traded to the Phoenix Suns in the 2001 offseason, and got considerably more playing time in 2001–02, as he played 59 games and averaged 5.0 points and 4.2 rebounds per game. The Suns were also rebuilding, however they managed to become successful in a short amount of time. The Suns made the playoffs in the 2002-2003 season which happened to be Voskuhl's first playoff appearance. The Suns lost to the San Antonio Spurs in 6 games. The Suns managed to acquire superstar point guard Steve Nash in the 2004 off season, and immediately became an elite team. In that season the Suns finished 62-20 which was the best recording in the Western Conference. Steve Nash won the MVP that season and overall the 2004-2005 season was Voskuhl's most successful season with any team. The Suns made a deep playoff push, however once again lost to the rival San Antonio Spurs in 5 games. After the season Voskuhl wouldn't make the playoffs in his career ever again. Overall, he played four years with the Suns, posting career-best averages in his third year with the team (6.6 ppg, 5.2 rpg).

Charlotte Bobcats (2005-2007) 
On August 2, 2005, Voskuhl was traded to the Charlotte Bobcats for a conditional second-round draft pick. In the 2006–07 season he saw more playing time than expected due to the exhaustion of Primož Brezec, and averaged 4.4 points per game. However Voskuhl's situation with the Bobcats was very similar to his situation with the Chicago Bulls. The team was rebuilding and wouldn't make the playoffs until a few years after Voskuhl's departure.

Milwaukee Bucks (2007-2008) 
Prior to the 2007–08 season, Milwaukee signed Voskuhl to a one-year, $3 million deal, as he battled for backup center to Andrew Bogut with Dan Gadzuric. His points and rebounds average was the same for the season: he averaged 2.2 points per game and 2.2 rebounds per game.

Toronto Raptors (2008-2009) 
On December 14, 2008 Voskuhl signed with the Toronto Raptors. He played 38 games for the team and his production on the court decreased. Voskuhl's final NBA game would be during his tenure as a Raptor on April 15th, 2009 in a 109 - 98 over the Chicago Bulls. In his final game, he recorded 2 points and 1 rebound.

Los Angeles Clippers (2010) 
He signed with the Mavericks in 2009, but did not make their final roster. He ended up missing the entire 2009-2010 season. On September 27, 2010, Voskuhl was signed to a non-guaranteed deal by the Los Angeles Clippers. He was waived on October 25.

Detroit Pistons (2011) 
On December 12, 2011 Voskuhl signed as a free agent with the Detroit Pistons. However 9 days later on December 21 he was waived. At 34 years old Voskuhl's career was over and he never returned to the NBA.

Personal life
Voskuhl and ex wife Jennifer Voskuhl have four daughters, Zoie, Skylar, Daisy, Shayne, and a son, Gage. He wears a size 17 sneaker.

He is a born-again Christian.

NBA career statistics

Regular season 

|-
| align="left" | 
| align="left" | Chicago
| 16 || 2 || 8.9 || .440 || .000 || .571 || 2.1 || .3 || .3 || .4 || 1.9
|-
| align="left" | 
| align="left" | Phoenix
| 59 || 34 || 15.3 || .554 || .000 || .752 || 4.2 || .3 || .2 || .4 || 5.0
|-
| align="left" | 
| align="left" | Phoenix
| 65 || 1 || 14.6 || .564 || .000 || .667 || 3.5 || .6 || .3 || .4 || 3.8
|-
| align="left" | 
| align="left" | Phoenix
| 66 || 43 || 24.3 || .507 || .000 || .740 || 5.2 || .9 || .6 || .4 || 6.6
|-
| align="left" | 
| align="left" | Phoenix
| 38 || 1 || 9.5 || .458 || .000 || .684 || 2.4 || .4 || .1 || .3 || 2.1
|-
| align="left" | 
| align="left" | Charlotte
| 51 || 2 || 16.0 || .437 || .333 || .683 || 3.6 || .8 || .5 || .5 || 5.3
|-
| align="left" | 
| align="left" | Charlotte
| 73 || 9 || 14.3 || .475 || .000 || .681 || 3.5 || .6 || .4 || .3 || 4.4
|-
| align="left" | 
| align="left" | Milwaukee
| 44 || 0 || 8.8 || .463 || .000 || .828 || 2.2 || .3 || .2 || .5 || 2.2
|-
| align="left" | 
| align="left" | Toronto
| 38 || 1 || 6.3 || .267 || .000 || .786 || 1.6 || .2 || .1 || .1 || .9
|- class="sortbottom"
| style="text-align:center;" colspan="2"| Career
| 450 || 93 || 14.3 || .487 || .333 || .714 || 3.4 || .5 || .3 || .4 || 4.0

Playoffs 

|-
| align="left" | 2003
| align="left" | Phoenix
| 6 || 0 || 16.3 || .706 || .000 || .923 || 3.7 || .3 || .7 || .7 || 6.0
|- class="sortbottom"
| style="text-align:center;" colspan="2"| Career
| 6 || 0 || 16.3 || .706 || .000 || .923 || 3.7 || .3 || .7 || .7 || 6.0

References

External links 
NBA.com profile of Jake Voskuhl
Stats at Basketball-Reference.com

1977 births
Living people
American expatriate basketball people in Canada
American expatriate basketball people in the Dominican Republic
American men's basketball players
Basketball players from Oklahoma
Centers (basketball)
Chicago Bulls draft picks
Charlotte Bobcats players
Chicago Bulls players
Milwaukee Bucks players
People from Katy, Texas
Phoenix Suns players
Sportspeople from Harris County, Texas
Sportspeople from Tulsa, Oklahoma
Strake Jesuit College Preparatory alumni
Toronto Raptors players
UConn Huskies men's basketball players